Gymnopilus turficola is a species of agaric fungus in the family Hymenogastraceae.

Habitat and distribution
It can be found growing in peat in subarctic tundra in northern Finland and in Finnmark, Norway.

See also

List of Gymnopilus species

References

turficola
Fungi described in 2001
Fungi of Europe
Taxa named by Meinhard Michael Moser